This is a list of populated places along the Missouri River in the United States.

Alphabetically
Arrow Rock, Missouri
Augusta, Missouri
Atchison, Kansas
Bellevue, Nebraska
Bismarck, North Dakota
Black Eagle, Montana
Boonville, Missouri
Bridgeton, Missouri
Brockton, Montana
Brownville, Nebraska
Cannon Ball, North Dakota
Carter Lake, Iowa
Cascade, Montana
Chamberlain, South Dakota
Chamois, Missouri
Chesterfield, Missouri
Council Bluffs, Iowa
Culbertson, Montana
Dakota City, Nebraska
Decatur, Nebraska
Defiance, Missouri
Elwood, Kansas
Florissant, Missouri
Fort Benton, Montana
Fort Peck, Montana
Fort Pierre, South Dakota
Fort Thompson, South Dakota
Fort Yates, North Dakota
Frazer, Montana
Gasconade, Missouri
Glasgow, Missouri
Great Falls, Montana
Hazelwood, Missouri
Hermann, Missouri
Iatan, Missouri
Independence, Missouri
Jefferson City, Missouri
Kansas City, Kansas
Kansas City, Missouri
Lansing, Kansas
Leavenworth, Kansas
Lexington, Missouri
Loma, Montana
Lower Brule, South Dakota
Lupus, Missouri
Mandan, North Dakota
Maryland Heights, Missouri
Matson, Missouri
Miami, Missouri
Missouri City, Missouri
Mobridge, South Dakota
Napoleon, Missouri
Nebraska City, Nebraska
New Haven, Missouri
Niobrara, Nebraska
North Kansas City, Missouri
Oacoma, South Dakota
Old Jamestown, Missouri
Omaha, Nebraska
Parkville, Missouri
Pick City, North Dakota
Pickstown, South Dakota
Pierre, South Dakota
Plattsmouth, Nebraska
Poplar, Montana
Randolph, Missouri
Rhineland, Missouri
Riverdale, North Dakota
Riverside, Missouri
Rocheport, Missouri
Rulo, Nebraska
St. Albans, Missouri
St. Charles, Missouri
St. Joseph, Missouri
Santee, Nebraska
Sibley, Missouri
Sioux City, Iowa
South Sioux City, Nebraska
Springfield, South Dakota
Stanton, North Dakota
Sugar Creek, Missouri
Toston, Montana
Townsend, Montana
Ulm, Montana
Washburn, North Dakota
Washington, Missouri
Waverly, Missouri
Weldon Spring, Missouri
West Alton, Missouri
White Cloud, Kansas
Wildwood, Missouri
Williston, North Dakota
Wolf Point, Montana
Yankton, South Dakota

Alphabetically by state

Iowa
Carter Lake
Council Bluffs
Sioux City

Kansas
Atchison
Elwood
Kansas City
Lansing
Leavenworth
White Cloud

Missouri
Arrow Rock
Boonville
Bridgeton
Chamois
Chesterfield
Defiance
Florissant
Gasconade
Glasgow
Hazelwood
Hermann
Independence
Iatan
Jefferson City
Kansas City
Lexington
Lupus
Maryland Heights
Matson
Miami
Missouri City
Napoleon
New Haven
North Kansas City
Old Jamestown
Parkville
Randolph
Rhineland
Riverside
Rocheport
St. Albans
St. Charles
St. Joseph
Sibley
Sugar Creek
Washington
Waverly
Weldon Spring
West Alton
Wildwood

Montana
Black Eagle
Brockton
Cascade
Culbertson
Fort Benton
Fort Peck
Frazer
Great Falls
Loma
Poplar
Toston
Townsend
Ulm
Wolf Point

Nebraska
Bellevue
Brownville
Dakota City
Decatur
Nebraska City
Niobrara
Omaha
Plattsmouth
Rulo
Santee
South Sioux City

North Dakota
Bismarck
Cannon Ball
Fort Yates
Mandan
Pick City
Riverdale
Stanton
Washburn
Williston

South Dakota
Chamberlain
Fort Pierre
Fort Thompson
Lower Brule
Mobridge
Oacoma
Pickstown
Pierre
Springfield
Yankton

Downstream, Montana to Missouri
Toston, Montana
Townsend, Montana
Cascade, Montana
Ulm, Montana
Great Falls, Montana
Black Eagle, Montana
Fort Benton, Montana
Loma, Montana
Fort Peck, Montana
Frazer, Montana
Wolf Point, Montana
Poplar, Montana
Brockton, Montana
Culbertson, Montana
Williston, North Dakota
Pick City, North Dakota
Riverdale, North Dakota
Stanton, North Dakota
Washburn, North Dakota
Mandan, North Dakota
Bismarck, North Dakota
Cannon Ball, North Dakota
Fort Yates, North Dakota
Mobridge, South Dakota
Pierre, South Dakota
Fort Pierre, South Dakota
Lower Brule, South Dakota
Fort Thompson, South Dakota
Chamberlain, South Dakota
Oacoma, South Dakota
Pickstown, South Dakota
Niobrara, Nebraska
Springfield, South Dakota
Santee, Nebraska
Yankton, South Dakota
Sioux City, Iowa
South Sioux City, Nebraska
Dakota City, Nebraska
Decatur, Nebraska
Omaha, Nebraska
Council Bluffs, Iowa
Carter Lake, Iowa
Bellevue, Nebraska
Plattsmouth, Nebraska
Nebraska City, Nebraska
Brownville, Nebraska
Rulo, Nebraska
White Cloud, Kansas
St. Joseph, Missouri
Elwood, Kansas
Atchison, Kansas
Leavenworth, Kansas
Lansing, Kansas
Kansas City, Kansas
Parkville, Missouri
Riverside, Missouri
Kansas City, Missouri
North Kansas City, Missouri
Independence, Missouri
Sugar Creek, Missouri
Missouri City, Missouri
Sibley, Missouri
Napoleon, Missouri
Lexington, Missouri
Waverly, Missouri
Miami, Missouri
Glasgow, Missouri
Arrow Rock, Missouri
Boonville, Missouri
Rocheport, Missouri
Lupus, Missouri
Jefferson City, Missouri
Chamois, Missouri
Gasconade, Missouri
Hermann, Missouri
New Haven, Missouri
Washington, Missouri
Augusta, Missouri
Matson, Missouri
St. Albans, Missouri
Defiance, Missouri
Wildwood, Missouri
Chesterfield, Missouri
Weldon Spring, Missouri
Maryland Heights, Missouri
St. Charles, Missouri
Bridgeton, Missouri
Hazelwood, Missouri
Florissant, Missouri
Old Jamestown, Missouri
West Alton, Missouri

Downstream by state

Montana
Toston
Townsend
Cascade
Ulm
Great Falls
Black Eagle
Fort Benton
Loma
Fort Peck
Frazer
Wolf Point
Poplar
Brockton
Culbertson

North Dakota
Williston
Pick City
Riverdale
Stanton
Washburn
Mandan
Bismarck
Cannon Ball
Fort Yates

South Dakota
Mobridge
Pierre
Fort Pierre
Lower Brule
Fort Thompson
Chamberlain
Oacoma
Pickstown
Springfield
Yankton

Nebraska
Niobrara
Santee
South Sioux City
Dakota City
Decatur
Omaha
Bellevue
Plattsmouth
Nebraska City
Brownville
Rulo

Iowa
Sioux City
Council Bluffs
Carter Lake

Kansas
White Cloud
Elwood
Atchison
Leavenworth
Lansing
Kansas City

Missouri
St. Joseph
Parkville
Riverside
Kansas City
North Kansas City
Independence
Sugar Creek
Missouri City
Sibley
Napoleon
Lexington
Waverly
Miami
Glasgow
Arrow Rock
Boonville
Rocheport
Lupus
Marion
Jefferson City
Chamois
Gasconade
Hermann
New Haven
Washington
Augusta
Matson
St. Albans
Defiance
Wildwood
Chesterfield
Weldon Spring
Maryland Heights
St. Charles
Bridgeton
Hazelwood
Florissant
Old Jamestown
West Alton

References

Missouri River